Damodar Gajanan Naik (born 6 September 1971) is an Indian politician and associated with the Bharatiya Janata Party from the state of Goa. He was the member for the Fatorda constituency of the Goa Legislative Assembly between 2002 and 2012 in the Cabinet of Manohar Parrikar.

Early life and education 
Damodar Naik was born on 6 September 1971 to Gajanan B. Naik and Laxmi G. Naik. He obtained a Bachelor of Arts from Goa University in 1994.

Political career 
He represented the Fatorda Assembly constituency for the Bharatiya Janata Party. He was elected to the Goa Legislative Assembly from the same constituency in the 2002 Goa Legislative Assembly election and the 2007 Goa Legislative Assembly election. He served as the National Executive Member of Bharatiya Janata Yuva Morcha in 2006. He contested for the Goa Legislative Assembly from Fatorda constituency  in February 2022 as a member of Bharatiya Janata Party. and lost to Vijay Sardessai by 1527 votes.

References

External links 
 Members of the Goa Legislative Assembly 
 fatorda Vidhan Sabha Chunav 2022: Assembly Elections News, fatorda Constituency, Vidhan Sabha Seat- hindi.news18.com

1971 births
Living people
Goa MLAs 2002–2007
Goa MLAs 2007–2012
People from South Goa district
Bharatiya Janata Party politicians from Goa